Milan Uhrík (born 21 December 1984) is a Slovak politician who was elected as a Member of the European Parliament in 2019. He was a member of the far-right party Kotleba – People's Party Our Slovakia until 2021, when he transformed the former party HZD into his own far-right party called "Republic".

References

Living people
MEPs for Slovakia 2019–2024
People's Party Our Slovakia politicians
1984 births
Members of the National Council (Slovakia) 2016-2020